This is a list of governors for Jönköping County of Sweden, from 1634 to present.
Bengt Kafle (1634–1636)
Bengt Bagge (1636–1639)
Knut Soop (1639–1645)
Bengt Ribbing (1645–1653)
Gustaf Posse (1653–1658)
Johan Printz (1658–1663)
Gustaf Ribbing (1663–1672)
Hans Georg Mörner (1672–1685)
Robert Lichton (1685–1687)
Erik Dahlbergh (1687–1693)
Nils Gyllenstierna (1693–1696)
Mårten Lindhielm (1696–1716)
Georg Reinhold Patkull (1716–1718)
Anders Leijonhielm (1718–1727)
Johan von Mentzer (1728–1746)
Anders Tungelfeldt (1747–1751)
Ludvig von Saltza (1751–1762)
Claes Erik Silfverhielm (1762–1778)
Fredric Ulric Hamilton (1778–1795)
Eric Johan de la Grange (1795–1801)
Johan Axel Stedt (1801–1805)
Eric Gustaf Boije (1805–1815)
Lars Hierta (1815–1835)
Claes Gabriel Bergenstråhle (1835–1855)
Arvid Gustav Faxe (1856–1870)
Carl R Ekström (1870–1888)
Robert Dickson (1888–1892)
Hjalmar Palmstierna (1892–1906)
Fredrik E Pettersson (1906–1922)
Carl Malmroth (1922–1934)
Jakob W Spens, acting (1923–1924)
Felix Hamrin (1934–1937)
Olle Ekblom (1938–1957)
Allan Nordenstam (1957–1963)
Sven af Geijerstam (1964–1979)
Gösta Gunnarsson (1980–1997)
Birgit Friggebo (1998–2004)
Lars Engqvist (2004–2010)
Minoo Akhtarzand (2010–2016)
Håkan Sörman (2016–2017)
Anneli Wirtén, acting (2017–2018)
Helena Jonsson (15 January 2018–present)

Footnotes

References

Jonkoping